The Artillery Gun Module (AGM, Artillerie-Geschütz-Modul) is an air-portable self-propelled howitzer designed by Krauss-Maffei Wegmann. It is based on technology used in the German Army Panzerhaubitze 2000 (PzH 2000) system, to provide more air portable self-propelled artillery, transportable by Airbus A400 aircraft.

The system is fully autonomous, the crew sitting in the cab, with similar performance to the PzH 2000, but with reduced cost, crew levels and weight. The AGM uses the PzH 2000 ballistic fire-control computer with integrated NATO Armaments Ballistic Kernel and the Krauss-Maffei Wegmann Artillery Command and Control System. It is a modular system, the gun module can be fitted on a tracked or wheeled chassis. Costs can be reduced by fitting it to a user's suitable chassis of choice. Current development vehicles use a MLRS chassis. A vehicle independent auxiliary power unit (allowing the gun to be used with the carrier engine shut down) and an inertial reference unit with a Global Positioning System (GPS) connection are fitted. During trials in 2006, a demonstrator vehicle fired a volley of ten 155 mm rounds in 2 minutes and 19 seconds with a crew of two being seated in the fully armoured protected cab.

Other platforms

Donar 
A further development of the AGM was revealed in 2008 as the Donar 155mm self-propelled artillery system. The system uses a modified ASCOD 2 IFV chassis with a newer, more efficient two-man turret with a fully automatic ammunition loading and handling system.

Boxer
In April 2014, KMW decided to integrate the AGM onto the Boxer armored vehicle, with the system making an appearance at Eurosatory in June 2014.  The Boxer has to prove it can deal with recoil forces without stabilization, but stabilization concepts can be added if needed to retain shoot and scoot and 360 degree firing capability.  The Boxer-AGM system could be used as an upgrade option for countries with existing Boxer fleets.  Test firings were scheduled for late 2014.

As of 2019, firing trials with the turret traversed front and to its sides were carried out at WTD 41 proving ground and were successful without the use of stabilizers. The trials also demonstrated the ability to fire an 8-round burst and redeploy under 90 seconds, and carry out multi-round simultaneous impact missions. The combination of the Boxer vehicle with AGM became known as Remote Controlled Howitzer 155 (RCH 155) due to the turret module being remote controlled. Additionally, a remote weapons station with a .50 caliber machine gun has been fitted on the roof.

Potential customers 
The Artillery Gun Module was a potential choice for the Israel Defense Forces as they seek to replace the M109 in their service. However, in 2017, it appeared that the IDF had selected a development of the ATMOS 2000 instead, possibly because they preferred a wholly Israeli produced system for legal reasons.

See also 
 Panzerhaubitze 2000

References

External links
 Army-technology.com
 Janes.com
 Deutsche artillerie (in German)
 Donar

Self-propelled artillery of Germany
Post–Cold War artillery of Germany
155 mm artillery
Tracked self-propelled howitzers
 Artillerie Geschütz Modul
 Artillery Gun Module (AGM)